Stavropol is a city and the administrative centre of Stavropol Krai, Russia. As of the 2021 Census, its population was 547,820, making it one of Russia's fastest growing cities.

It was known as Voroshilovsk until January 12, 1943.

Etymology
The name Stavropol is a Russian rendering of the Greek name,  ( 'City of the Cross'). According to legend, soldiers found a stone cross there while building the fortress in the city's future location. It is unrelated to Byzantine Stauroupolis (ancient Aphrodisias) in Asia Minor, nor to the city of Stavropol-on-Volga (now called Tolyatti).

History
It was founded on October 22, 1777 following the Russo-Turkish War of 1768–1774 as a military encampment, and was granted city status in 1785. Prince Grigory Potemkin, who founded Stavropol as one of ten fortresses built between Azov and Mozdok at the request of Catherine the Great, played a leading role in the creation of the city. Don Cossacks, particularly those from the Khopersky Regiment, settled the area in and around the cities of Stavropol and Georgiyevsk with a mission to defend borders of the Empire.

Alexander I in 1809 invited several Armenian families to settle by the fortress, in order to encourage trade in the region.

Stavropol's strategic location aided in the Russian Empire's conquest of the Caucasus. By the early 19th century the city grew into a busy trade center of the North Caucasus. In 1843, an Episcopal see of the Russian Orthodox Church was established in Stavropol and in 1847 the city became the seat of Stavropol Governorate.

During the Russian Civil War the city changed hands several times and finally was captured by the Red Army from the Volunteer Army of general Anton Denikin on February 29, 1920. The city was renamed Voroshilovsk on May 5, 1935, after Kliment Voroshilov, but the original name was restored in 1943. The Great Patriotic War took a heavy toll on the city and between August 3, 1942 and January 21, 1943 Stavropol was occupied by the Germans and its airport was used as a base for the Luftwaffe (German air force) to bomb Soviet oil supplies in Grozny. The city was liberated by the Soviet Army in January, 1943. Since 1946, natural gas has been extracted near the city; later on, a pipeline to supply Moscow was built.

Administrative and municipal status
Stavropol is the administrative center of the krai. Within the framework of administrative divisions, it is, together with one rural locality (the khutor of Grushevy), incorporated as the city of krai significance of Stavropol—an administrative unit with the status equal to that of the districts. As a municipal division, the city of krai significance of Stavropol is incorporated as Stavropol Urban Okrug.

Economy
Stavropol's economy focuses on the production of automobiles, furniture, and construction equipment and materials. The city relies on air transport through Shpakovskoye airport as well as rail and highway connections to other Russian cities.

Demographics

Stavropol's 2021 population is now estimated at 453,387. In 1950, the population of Stavropol was 108,353. Stavropol has grown by 3,293 since 2015, which represents a 0.73% annual change.

Facilities
Stavropol has a theater and an association football team called FC Dynamo Stavropol.

The main educational institutions of the town include North-Caucasus Federal University, Stavropol State Agrarian University, and Stavropol State Medical University.

The area of Russia in which Stavropol resides is very mountainous, placing the city in the midst of the northern Caucasus mountain range. The city has one of the biggest city parks in Russia, 'Victory Park' covering up to 200 hectares.

The city, like many other Russian cities has its own botanical garden, which covers up to 18 hectares, including 16 hectares of natural woods.

Climate
Stavropol experiences a humid subtropical climate (Köppen climate classification: Cfa), bordering an oceanic climate (Cfb) or, following the  isotherm, a humid continental climate (Dfa/Dfb), with short but cold winters (though mild for Russia) and hot summers. Precipitation is rather low, with a  annual average.

Stavropol is not protected by the mountains in the winter months, so it can frequently get very cold.

Notable people
Well-known Russians who have visited or resided in Stavropol include: Generals Alexander Suvorov (1730–1800), Alexey Yermolov (1777–1861), and Nikolay Raevsky (1771—1829); the poets Alexander Pushkin (1799–1837) and Mikhail Lermontov (1814–1841), who were in political disfavor, the surgeon Nikolay Pirogov (1810—1881), Alexander Griboyedov (1795–1829), Leo Tolstoy (1828–1910), and the national poet of Ossetia, Kosta Khetagurov.

The first and only executive president of the Soviet Union, Mikhail Gorbachev (1931-2022), was born in Stavropol Krai and spent several years working in the city of Stavropol as the head of the krai's administration. Gorbachev's chief mentor, long-time friend, and predecessor Yuri Andropov (1914–1984) was also born in Stavropol Krai.

Actor Lev Gorn (born 1971) star of The Americans, and Serge de Sazo (1915–2012) Russian born French photographer, were born in Stavropol.

An abbess of the Catholic Church of the Byzantine Rite, Serafima Meletieva was born in 1886 at Stavropol.

Piotr Mikhailovich Skarżyński (1744-1805), A Russian Major General. He served in the cavalry units of the Russian army and he commanded the Buzhan Cossacks during the Russo-Turkish War of 1787-1791, he showed heroism during the assault on Ochakov and the defense of the Kinburn fortress. He was awarded the Order of St. George. He owned an estate in Stavropol where he made wine.

Twin towns – sister cities

Stavropol is twinned with:

 Des Moines, United States
 Béziers, France
 Pazardzhik, Bulgaria
 Yerevan, Armenia
 Zhenjiang, China
 Changzhou, China

References

Notes

Sources

External links
Official website of Stavropol
 
Pictures of Stavropol 

 
Stavropol Governorate
Populated places established in 1777